Stone Conrad Hallquist (April 8, 1902June 1, 1981) was an American football running back, who played for the Milwaukee Badgers in the National Football League.

Biography
Hallquist was born in Söderholm, Sweden. He went to South Division High School and Middlebury College. He played 9 regular season games over 1 season, in 1926.

He died in Sun City, Arizona.

References

External links
 Fantasy Football Challenge
 Database Football

1902 births
1981 deaths
Middlebury Panthers football players
Swedish players of American football
Players of American football from Milwaukee
South Division High School alumni
Swedish emigrants to the United States